Qonggyai County or Chongye County, is a county of Shannan in the Tibet Autonomous Region.

History
The site possesses eight large mounds of earth resembling natural hills that are believed to contain eight to ten buried Tibetan kings.

Other sources, however, have indicated that there are actually nine mounds rather than eight or ten. The kings believed to be buried at the site include Songtsen Gampo (the founder of the Tibetan Empire), Mangsong Mangtsen, Tridu Songtsen, Gyangtsa Laban, Me Agtsom, Trisong Detsen, Muné Tsenpo and Ralpacan.

Qonggyai Dzong was established in mid-14th century under Phagmodrupa rule. Under the Ganden Podrang, the county was part of Lhoka Governor's jurisdiction. Since 1960, Qonggyai county is part of Lhoka (Shannan) prefecture.

Geography and climate
Qonggyai County is located in the middle of the Brahmaputra River valley and covers an area of 1030 square km, with 2.8 million mu of arable land, an area of 1.3 million mu of grassland, with a forest area of 0.7 million mu. The county had a total population of 20,000 people in 2003.

Qonggyai County is located in southern Tibet and is surrounded by mountains. It has an average elevation of about 3900 meters, with a maximum altitude of 6450 meters. It is in a temperate semi-arid plateau monsoon climate zone, with an annual frost-free period of about 125,153 days. The annual rainfall is 345 millimeters and natural disasters, mainly droughts, floods, hail and pests are common. Mineral resources include mainly crystal stone, jade, chromium and iron. Antelope, black-necked crane, otter, swan, eagle and river deer are common.

Economy
Qonggyai is dominated by agriculture, and is one of the grain based counties in Shannan. Crops grown are mainly highland barley, winter wheat, spring wheat, peas, radish, potatoes and so on. Livestock include yak, pianniu, cattle, sheep, goats, mainly. A forested area of  contains some apple, pear and peach orchards. Ethnic handicrafts forms most of the industrial sector and products include buckets, kettles, Tibetan cabinets, bowls, bracelets, necklaces, incense, butter lamps, etc.

Commercial, financial, telecommunications, hospitals, schools and other public facilities are located in this small political, economic, and cultural center.

Towns and populated places 
Qonggyai Town (Qonggyai, Chongye)
Qoi

References

External links
 Qonggyai County Annals

Counties of Tibet
Shannan, Tibet